Aşağı Zeynəddin (also, Ashagy Zeynaddin) is a village and municipality in the Agdash Rayon of Azerbaijan. It has a population of 1,181. The municipality consists of the villages of Aşağı Zeynəddin, Yeniarx, and  Tatlar.

References 

Populated places in Agdash District